The Asia-Pacific Fishery Commission (APFIC), originally called the Indo-Pacific Fisheries Council (IPFC) is a Food and Agriculture Organization (FAO) Article XIV Regional Fisheries Body which covers fisheries, aquaculture and related aquatic resource issues in the Asia-Pacific region. APFIC functions as a Regional Consultative Forum raising awareness amongst member countries,  fisheries organizations and fisheries professionals in the Asia-Pacific region.

Most recently  work has focussed on  developing  a training  course for Ecosystem Approach to  Fishery Management and guidelines for tropical trawl fisheries management.

The Secretariat is housed in the FAO Regional Office for Asia and the Pacific in Bangkok, Thailand.

Country membership 
According to the Agreement on the Establishment of the Asia-Pacific Fishery Commission, eligibility for membership is based on:

Member Nations and Associate Members of the Food and Agriculture Organization (FAO) which accept the Agreement in accordance with Article X thereof. Other States that are Members of the United Nations, any of its Specialized Agencies or the International Atomic Energy Agency may be admitted as members by a two-thirds majority of the Commission's members.

The current member countries are:
Australia, Bangladesh, Cambodia, People's Republic of China, France, India, Indonesia, Japan, Republic of Korea, Malaysia, Myanmar, Nepal, New Zealand, Pakistan, Philippines, Vietnam, Sri Lanka, Timor Leste, Thailand, United Kingdom, United States

A former member state is the Netherlands.

APFIC area of  competence 
In Article VI of the APFIC Agreement the 'APFIC area' is described as:
Area - The Commission shall carry out the functions and responsibilities set forth in Article IV in the Asia-Pacific Area.

Comment

This description is a broad definition of the  area where APFIC will conduct its work. The abolition of the Indian Ocean Fishery Commission (IOFC) and its Committee for the Development and Management of Fisheries in the Bay of Bengal (BOBC) in June 1999 resulted in closer involvement of APFIC in this sub-region, as the functions of BOBC was transferred to APFIC by the FAO Council’s Resolution 1/116 (Report of the  116th Session of the  FAO Council). This was subsequently endorsed by the  26th Session of APFIC in Beijing 1998.

There is no change to the APFIC  agreement in terms of membership, area of competence and functions of the Commission,  there have been subsequent recommendations by the  Commission to clarify  where its focus of  work should lie. The Report  APFIC Ad hoc Legal and Financial Working Group proposed that APFIC concentrate its activities on three subregions of the Asia-Pacific:

• the Yellow Sea and its adjacent waters
• the South China Sea and its adjacent waters and
• the Bay of Bengal.

As APFIC adapts to the changing needs of fisheries and aquaculture in the  Asia-Pacific, its role and function have been clarified  as part of  the development of a Strategic Plan for the Commission.

See also
 Western and Central Pacific Fisheries Commission
 Pacific Community
 BOBPIGO Bay of Bengal Programme IGO
 Southeast Asian Fisheries Development Center

References 
 APFIC: ITS EVOLUTION, ACHIEVEMENTS AND FUTURE DIRECTION
 DECISION-MAKING IN REGIONAL FISHERY BODIES OR ARRANGEMENTS: THE EVOLVING ROLE OF RFBS AND INTERNATIONAL AGREEMENT ON DECISION-MAKING PROCESSES
 APFIC: Its Changing Role

External links
 Official website

Fisheries agencies
Food and Agriculture Organization
Organizations established in 1948
Intergovernmental organizations established by treaty
Organizations based in Bangkok
International organizations based in Thailand